Temora kerguelensis is a marine copepod in the Temoridae family. It was first described in 1911 by English oceanographer Richard Norris Wolfenden. The adult specimen measures around 2 mm. It has been recorded in sub-Antarctic waters of the southern Indian Ocean near Kerguelen Islands.

References

Temoridae
Crustaceans of the Indian Ocean
Crustaceans described in 1911